The Sumgayit FK 2019–20 season was Sumgayit's ninth Azerbaijan Premier League season, and tenth season in their history.

Season events
On 13 March 2020, the Azerbaijan Premier League was postponed due to the COVID-19 pandemic.

On 19 June 2020, the AFFA announced that the 2019–20 season had been officially ended without the resumption of the remains matches due to the escalating situation of the COVID-19 pandemic in Azerbaijan.

Squad

Transfers

In

Loans in

Out

Released

Friendlies

Competitions

Azerbaijan Premier League

Results summary

Results by round

Results

League table

Azerbaijan Cup

Squad statistics

Appearances and goals

|-
|colspan="14"|Players away from Sumgayit on loan:
|-
|colspan="14"|Players who left Sumgayit during the season:

|}

Goal scorers

Clean sheet

Disciplinary record

References

Azerbaijani football clubs 2019–20 season
Sumgayit FK seasons